Lieutenant General William Home, 8th Earl of Home (1681 – 28 April 1761) was a Scottish peer and the British Governor of Gibraltar between 1757 and 1761. Lord Home was a well-known spendthrift.

Military career 
He inherited the title Earl of Home in 1720 on the death of his father, Alexander Home, 7th Earl of Home. He was commissioned into the 2nd Regiment of Dragoon Guards in 1735. Home married wealthy Jamaican-English heiress Elizabeth Lawes for her fortune on Christmas Day 1742. The couple would have no children, and the Earl deserted his wife in February 1743 for unknown reasons, taking a commission as a captain in the 3rd regiment of dragoon guards in July 1743. The couple remained technically married, however, and the Countess of Home went on to become a society figure, entertaining lavishly at her London home, Home House.

Lord Home fought at the Battle of Prestonpans in 1745 under Sir John Cope. Distinguishing service meant that he was given command of the Glasgow volunteer regiment of foot which was given orders to defend Stirling. He did well as most of the Jacobite forces were in England making their way to Derby with Bonnie Prince Charlie.

On 11 August 1750 he became colonel of the 48th (Northamptonshire) Regiment of Foot, transferring on 29 April 1752 to become colonel of the 25th (Edinburgh) Regiment of Foot until his death.

In 1757 he was made Governor of Gibraltar and in 1759 promoted to Lieutenant General.

Death and legacy
He was meant to return to England on 29 April 1761 but he died the day before in Gibraltar. His younger brother Alexander succeeded him as Earl. Despite the separation, his wife Elizabeth retained her title and remained independently wealthy due to her father and first husband until her death in 1784. She was buried in Westminster Abbey.

The UK Government has a painting of Major General William Home in its collection attributed to the British school of painters.

References 

Works cited
  
 
  
 

|-

1681 births
1761 deaths
British Army lieutenant generals
Earls of Home
Scottish representative peers
British Army personnel of the Jacobite rising of 1745
2nd Dragoon Guards (Queen's Bays) officers
48th Regiment of Foot officers
29th Regiment of Foot officers
Governors of Gibraltar
William